Kevin Lacruz Coscolín (born 13 February 1992) is a Spanish footballer who plays as a midfielder for CD Teruel.

Club career
Born in Zaragoza, Aragon, Lacruz joined hometown club Real Zaragoza's youth setup in 2005, aged 13. At only 17 years and 157 days, he made his professional debut, coming on as a substitute for Jermaine Pennant at the hour-mark of a 1–4 La Liga away loss against Sevilla FC on 12 September 2009 and being the second youngest player ever to appear in the league for the team, after Moisés. He would spend several seasons mainly registered with the reserve side, however.

On 15 July 2013, Lacruz joined Real Betis, being assigned to the B-team in Tercera División. On 19 August of the following year, he terminated his contract and signed with CD Guadalajara hours later.

Honours
Spain U17
FIFA U-17 World Cup: Third place 2009

References

External links

1992 births
Living people
Footballers from Zaragoza
Spanish footballers
Association football midfielders
La Liga players
Segunda División B players
Tercera División players
Real Zaragoza B players
Real Zaragoza players
Betis Deportivo Balompié footballers
CD Guadalajara (Spain) footballers
CD Ebro players
CF Badalona players
SD Ejea players
Barakaldo CF footballers
UP Langreo footballers
CD Teruel footballers
Spain youth international footballers